Same Airstrip  is an airstrip serving the town of Same in the Kilimanjaro Region of Tanzania.

There is rising and mountainous terrain in all quadrants except east.

See also

 List of airports in Tanzania
 Transport in Tanzania

References

Airport information india

External links
Tanzania Airports Authority
OurAirports - Same
OpenStreetMap - Same

Airstrips in Tanzania
Buildings and structures in the Kilimanjaro Region